This is a bibliography of hedges and topiary. It includes works relating to the natural history and botany of the hedgerow as well as works relating to the horticultural practice of the creation of topiary, and works relating to the cultivation of Buxus, a plant commonly used to create hedges.

Boxwood

 Adams, Katharina. (2004) Buchs. Stuttgart: Kosmos Garten. .
 Batdorf, Lynn. (2003) Caring For Box. Rye: Sage Press. .
 — (2004) Boxwood – An Illustrated Encyclopedia. Boyce, Virginia: The American Boxwood Society. .
 — (2005) Boxwood Handbook – A practical guide to knowing and growing boxwood. 3rd edition. Boyce, Virginia: The American Boxwood Society. .

Hedgerows

 Barker, Hugh. (2012) Hedge Britannia: A Curious History of a British Obsession. London: Bloomsbury. .
Croxton P.J., Franssen W., Myhill D.G. & Sparks T.H. (2004) "The restoration of neglected hedges: a comparison of management treatments", Biological Conservation, 117, 19-23.
 Pollard, E. et al. (1974) Hedges. William Collins.
 White, John Talbot. (1980) Hedgerow. Ash & Grant, London. Illustrated by Eric Thomas. . Later editions Dorling Kindersley.
 Wright, John. (2016) A Natural History of the Hedgerow and Ditches, Dykes and Dry Stone Walls. London: Profile. .

Topiary

 Baker, Margaret. (1982) Discovering Topiary. Tring: Shire Publications. .
 Blanke, Rolf. (1997) Kunstwerke in Grün (Artwork in Green) Ulmer: Stuttgart. .
 Brooklyn Botanic Garden. (1968) Plants and Gardens Handbook 36: Trained and Sculptured Plants. New York: Brooklyn Botanic Garden.
 Carr, David. (1989) Topiary and Plant Sculpture: A beginner's step-by-step guide. Marlborough: Crowood. .
 Clarke, Ethne & George Wright. (1988) English Topiary Gardens. London: Weidenfeld and Nicolson. .
 Curtis, Charles and W. Gibson. (1904) The Book of Topiary.
 Hadfield, Miles. (1971) Topiary and Ornamental Hedges: Their history and cultivation. London: A & C Black.
 Lloyd, Nathaniel. (1925) Topiary: Garden Art in Yew and Box. London: Ernest Benn.

References

Horticulture
Bibliographies by subject